

Nicolae Cernăuțeanu (born 1892 in Hotin), was a Bessarabian politician. He served as Member of Sfatul Țării (the Parliament of Bessarabia) in 1917–1918.

Bibliography 
Gheorghe E. Cojocaru, Sfatul Țării: itinerar, Civitas, Chișinău, 1998,  
Mihai Tașcă, Sfatul Țării și actualele autorități locale, Timpul de dimineață, no. 114 (849), June 27, 2008 (page 16)

Notes

External links
 Arhiva pentru Sfatul Țării 
 Deputații Sfatului Țării și Lavrenti Beria

Moldovan MPs 1917–1918
Year of death missing
1892 births
People from Khotyn